Pultenaea laxiflora, commonly known as loose-flower bush-pea, is a species of flowering plant in the family Fabaceae and is endemic to south-eastern continental Australia. It is a low-lying to prostrate, spreading shrub with linear to narrow egg-shaped leaves with the narrower end towards the base, and yellow and red to brown or purple flowers.

Description
The standard and wings are yellow with red markings, the standard  with, and the keel is red to brown or purple.

Taxonomy and naming
Pultenaea laxiflora was first formally described in 1864 by George Bentham in Flora Australiensis. The specific epithet (laxiflora) means "wide, loose or open-flowered".

Distribution and habitat
Loose-flowered bush-pea grows in forest in New South Wales, the Australian Capital Territory, Victoria and South Australia. It is found on the western slopes of New South Wales and the Australian Capital Territory south from Bathurst, in the drier areas of central and western Victoria to the south-east of South Australia, including Kangaroo Island.

References

laxiflora
Flora of Victoria (Australia)
Flora of the Australian Capital Territory
Flora of New South Wales
Flora of South Australia
Plants described in 1864
Taxa named by George Bentham